The viola d'amore (Italian for "viol of love") is a 7- or 6-stringed musical instrument with sympathetic strings used chiefly in the baroque period. It is played under the chin in the same manner as the violin.

Structure and sound 

The viola d'amore shares many features of the viol family. It looks like a thinner treble viol without frets and sometimes with sympathetic strings added. The six-string viola d'amore and the treble viol also have approximately the same ambitus or range of playable notes. Like all viols, it has a flat back. An intricately carved head at the top of the peg box is common on both viols and viola d'amore, although some viols lack one. Unlike the carved heads on viols, the viola d'amore's head occurs most often as Cupid blindfolded to represent the blindness of love. Its sound-holes are commonly in the shape of a flaming sword known as "The Flaming Sword of Islam" (suggesting the instrument's development was influenced by the Islamic World). This was one of the three usual sound hole shapes for viols as well. It is unfretted, and played much like a violin, being held horizontally under the chin. It is about the same size as the modern viola.

The viola d'amore usually has six or seven playing strings, which are sounded by drawing a bow across them, just as with a violin. In addition, it has an equal number of sympathetic strings located below the main strings and the fingerboard which are not played directly but vibrate in sympathy with the notes played. A common variation is six playing strings, and instruments exist with as many as fourteen sympathetic strings alone. Despite the fact that the sympathetic strings are now thought of as the most characteristic element of the instrument, early forms of the instrument almost uniformly lacked them. The first unambiguous reference to a viola d'amore with sympathetic strings does not occur until the 1730s. Both types continued to be built and played through the 18th century.

Largely thanks to the sympathetic strings, the viola d'amore has a particularly sweet and warm sound. Leopold Mozart, writing in his Versuch einer gründlichen Violinschule, said that the instrument sounded "especially charming in the stillness of the evening."

The first known mention of the name viol d'amore appeared in John Evelyn's Diary (20 November 1679): "for its swetenesse & novelty the Viol d'Amore of 5 wyre-strings, plaid on with a bow, being but an ordinary violin, play'd on Lyra way by a German, than which I never heard a sweeter Instrument or more surprizing..."

Range 

As on the treble viol, the register above the octave (d) on the top string would seldom be used except in contemporary music. The viola d'amore was normally tuned specifically for the piece it was to play - cf. scordatura. Towards the end of the 18th century the standard tuning became Open D Major: A, d, a, d', f', a', d".

Use 

The instrument was especially popular in the late 17th century, although a specialised viola d'amore player would have been highly unusual, since it was customary for professional musicians to play a number of instruments, especially within the family of the musician's main instrument. Later, the instrument fell from use, as the volume and power of the violin family became preferred over the delicacy and sweetness of the viol family. However, there has been renewed interest in the viola d'amore in the last century. The viola players Henri Casadesus and Paul Hindemith both played the viola d'amore in the early 20th century, and the film composer Bernard Herrmann made use of it in several scores. It may be noted that, like instruments of the violin family, the modern viola d'amore was altered slightly in structure from the baroque version, mainly to support the extra tension of steel wound strings.

Leoš Janáček originally planned to use the viola d'amore in his second string quartet, "Intimate Letters". The use of the instrument was symbolic of the nature of his relationship with Kamila Stösslová, a relationship that inspired the work. However, the version with viola d'amore was found in rehearsal to be impracticable, and Janáček re-cast the part for a conventional viola.
Sergei Prokofiev's ballet Romeo and Juliet features a viola d'amore as well.
 
The viola d'amore can regularly be heard today in musical ensembles that specialise in historically informed performances of Baroque music on authentic instruments.

Scordatura notation 

Scordatura notation was first used in the late seventeenth century as a way to quickly read music for violin with altered tunings. It was a natural choice for viola d'amore and other stringed instruments not tuned in the usual fifths, especially those whose intervals between strings are not uniform across their range. Heinrich Ignaz Franz Biber, Antonio Vivaldi and Johann Joseph Vilsmayr (a student of Biber), among others, wrote pieces for violin with one or more strings retuned to notes other than the usual fifths. Given that the viola d’amore was usually played by violinists and that many different tunings were used, scordatura notation made it easier for a violinist to read the music.

Scordatura notation exists in a number of different types. Treble clef, alto clef and soprano clefs are all used by different composers. Bass clef is typically used for notes on the lower two or three strings (6 or 7 string instruments) and usually sounds an octave higher than written. In scordatura, one imagines that one is playing a violin (or in some cases a viola, where alto clef is used) tuned in the normal fifths. Scordatura notation informs the player not about what note will sound but rather about where they should place their fingers; therefore, it may be referred to as a tablature or "finger" notation.

In Biber's Harmonia Artificiosa no. VII, a different version of scordatura notation is used. Biber uses a nine line staff. The clefs used are based on alto clef (imagining that you are playing a viola). The piece is written for a six-stringed instrument. The upper part of the staff supposes that you are playing on the upper four strings and the lower part that you are playing on the lower four strings (still imagining that you are reading the four strings of a viola in alto clef). This does mean that there are two ways of notating notes on the middle two strings but it quickly becomes apparent, when playing, what the correct reading should be.

Repertoire 
Baroque period
 Heinrich Biber (1644–1704)
 Partita VII for two viole d'amore and basso continuo, from Harmonia artificiosa - ariosa, 1696.
 Christian Pezold (1677-1733)
 2 Partitas for solo viola d'amore
 Attilio Ariosti (1666–1729)
 6 Lessons for viola d'amore and continuo
 15 Sonatas
 used in 2 cantatas
 used as an obbligato instrument in the opera, "Marte Placato"
 Antonio Vivaldi (1678–1741)
 Concerto in D major, RV 392, P.166
 Concerto in D minor, RV 393, P.289
 Concerto in D minor, RV 394, P.288
 Concerto in D minor, RV 395, P.287
 Concerto in A major, RV 396, P.233
 Concerto in A minor, RV 397, P.37
 Concerto in D minor for viola d'amore and lute, RV 540
 Concerto da Camera in F major for viola d'amore, 2 oboes, 2 horns, bassoon, continuo, RV 97
 Vivaldi also used the viola d'amore as an obbligato instrument in sacred works and operas:
 Nisi Dominus, RV 608 Gloria Patri
 Nisi Dominus, RV 803 Nisi Dominus
 Tito Manlio, RV 738 Tu dormi in tante pene
 Juditha Triumphans, 644 Quanto magis generosa
 Christoph Graupner (1683–1760)
 Concerto in D major for viola d'amore, strings and continuo, GWV 314
 Concerto in F major for flute, viola d'amore, chalumeau, strings and continuo, GWV 327
 Concerto in D major for flauto d'amore, oboe d'amore, viola d'amore, strings and continuo, GWV 333
 Concerto in g minor for viola d'amore, strings and continuo, GWV 336
 Concerto in A major for viola, viola d'amore, strings and continuo, GWV 339
 Concerto in B major for chalumeau, viola d'amore, oboe, strings and continuo, GWV 343
 Ouverture in D major for oboe d'amore, viola d'amore, strings and continuo, GWV 419
 Ouverture in D minor for bassoon, viola d'amore, strings and continuo, GWV 426
 Ouverture in D major for viola d'amore, strings and continuo, GWV 427
 Ouverture in E major for viola d'amore, strings and continuo, GWV 438
 Ouverture in F major for flute, viola d'amore, chalumeau, strings and continuo, GWV 450
 Ouverture in F major for flute, viola d'amore, 2 chalumeaux, strings and continuo, GWV 451
 Ouverture in G major for viola d'amore, strings and continuo, GWV 459
 Ouverture in G major for viola d'amore, strings and continuo, GWV 460
 Ouverture in G major for viola d'amore, bassoon, strings and continuo, GWV 465
 Ouverture in A major for viola d'amore, strings and continuo, GWV 476
 Ouverture in A major for flute, viola d'amore, oboe, bassoon, strings and continuo, GWV 477
 Sinfonia in F major for soli viola d'amore, cello and bassoon, 3 violas and basso continuo, GWV 577
 Trio Sonata in B major for flute, viola d'amore and continuo, GWV 217
 Trio Sonata in C major for flute, viola d'amore and continuo, GWV 202
 Trio Sonata in D major for flute, viola d'amore and continuo, GWV 205
 Trio Sonata in D minor for flute, viola d'amore and continuo, GWV 207
 Trio Sonata in E minor for flute, viola d'amore and continuo, GWV 209
 Trio Sonata in F major for viola d'amore, bass chalumeau and continuo, GWV 210
 Graupner also used the viola d'amore as an obbligato instrument in 18 of his cantatas:
 Ach Sterbliche bedenkt das Ende, GWV 1157/25
 Erschrocknes Zion sei erfreut, GWV 1128/24
 Erwacht ihr Heiden, GWV 1111/34
 Gott ist's der in euch wirket, GWV 1163/23
 Halleluja Dank und Ehre, GWV 1109/40
 Herr unser Gott, GWV 1174/17
 Ich habe Lust abzuscheiden, GWV 1175/26c
 Ihr schlummert, ihr schlafet
 Jesu frommer Menschenherden, GWV 1140/25
 Kommet herzu lasset uns dem Herrn frohlocken, GWV 1174/38
 Lobet ihr Knechte des Herrn, GWV 1174/18
 Preise Jerusalem den Herrn, GWV 1174/20
 Schicket euch in die Zeit, GWV 1151/14
 So demütiget euch nun, GWV 1125/23
 Wer die Wahrheit tut, GWV 1139/38
 Wir warten eines neuen Himmels, GWV 1167/23
 Wir wissen dass unser irdisches Haus, GWV 1175/39b
 Wisset ihr nicht dass auf diesen Tag, GWV 1127/26
 Georg Philipp Telemann (1681–1767)
 Concerto in E major for flute, oboe d'amore, viola d'amore, strings and continuo
 Trio Sonata in D major for flute, viola d'amore and continuo
 No.26 & 36 in Brockes Passion, TWV 5:1
 Cantata Herr lehre uns bedenken dass wir sterben müssen, TWV 1:763
 Johann Sebastian Bach (1685–1750)
 used in aria no.19 and 20 of the Johannes Passion and in Cantatas Nos. 36c, 152, and 205
 Tritt auf die Glaubensbahn, BWV 152
 Johann Joachim Quantz (1697–1773)
 Two Trio Sonatas (in F major and c minor) for flute, viola d'amore and continuo
 Louis-Toussaint Milandre (18th century)
 Pièces pour une viole d'amour avec basse
 Pièces pour une viole d'amour, violon et basse
 Trio en fa pour une viole d'amour, violon et basse
 Carlo Martinides (c.1731–1794)
 Divertimento in D major for viola d'amore, violin, viola and cello
 Joseph Haydn (1732–1809)
 Divertimento for viola d'amore, violin and cello; This is an arrangement of a work by Haydn, but made in the 18th century.
 Carl Stamitz (1745–1801)
 3 solo Concertos
 Sonata in D major for viola d'amore and violin or viola
 various other sonatas
 Quartet for oboe, violin, viola d'amore and cello
 Franz Anton Hoffmeister (1754–1812)
 Quartet in E major (D major) for viola d'amore, 2 violins and cello
 Joseph Leopold Eybler (1765–1846)
 Quintet No.1 in D major for viola d'amore, violin, viola, cello and violone
 Quintet No.2 in D major for viola d'amore, violin, viola, cello and violone
 Offertorium, "In Festo Sta. Theresia" for Tenor, soli viola d'amore, cello, with strings and chorus

Modern works
 Louis van Waefelghem (1840–1908)
 Romance in D major for violin or viola d'amore and piano (1891)
 Soir d'automne (Autumn Evening), Melody for viola d'amore or viola and piano or harp (1903)
 Charles Martin Loeffler (1861–1935)
 La mort de Tintagiles, Symphonic poem for viola d'amore and orchestra, Op. 6 (1897–1900)
 'The Lone Prairie" for tenor saxophone, viola d'amore and piano
 Miscellaneous pieces for viola d'amore with other instruments and/or chorus.
 Henri Casadesus (1879–1947)
 Concerto for viola d'amore and strings
 24 Préludes for viola d'amore and harpsichord, piano or harp (1931)
 Heitor Villa-Lobos (1887–1959)
 Amazonas
 Frank Martin (1890–1974)
 Sonata da chiesa for viola d'amore and organ or string orchestra (1952)
 Paul Hindemith (1895–1963)
 Kleine Sonate (Small Sonata) for viola d'amore and piano, Op. 25 No. 2 (1922)
 Kammermusik No. 6 for viola d'amore and chamber orchestra, Op. 46 No. 1 (1927)
 Bruno Maderna (1920–1973)
 Viola per viola sola (o viola d'amore) (1971)
 Paul Rosenbloom (*1952)
 Concerto for two viole d'amore and chamber orchestra (1994)
 Michael Edwards (*1968)
 24/7:: freedom fried for viola d'amore and live electronics (2006)
 Dario Palermo (*1970)
 Ritual for viola d'amore, real time composition and live electronics (2007)
 Emily Doolittle (*1972)
 Virelais for viola d'amore and voice (2001)

 Ottorino Respighi (1879-1936)
 Quartet for quinton, viola d'amore, viola da gamba, basse de viole

 Rachel Stott (*1968)
 Odysseus in Ogygia for six viole d'amore (2011)
 Tartini and his Pupil for two viole d'amore (2016)
  Ariel's Songs for soprano and two viole d'amore (2000)
  Wenn Wege sich Kreuzen for soprano and viola d'amore (2013) 
  Maturity for soprano and viola d'amore (2014)

 Hans Vermeersch (*1957)
 Gadbad-Confusion for two viole d'amore, viola da gamba and cembalo (2012)
 Bhalobasha-Love for viola d'amore and tape (2012)
 Makbaraa-Tombeau for two viole d'amore, cello and cembalo (2014)
 Stootch-Reflection for viola d'amore and tape (2014)

The viola d'amore is also used in 
 Les Huguenots (1836) by Giacomo Meyerbeer
 Bánk bán (1861) by Ferenc Erkel
 Le jongleur de Notre-Dame (1901) and "Cendrillon" (1899) by Jules Massenet
 Madama Butterfly (1904) by Giacomo Puccini
 Palestrina (1912) by Hans Pfitzner
 Káťa Kabanová (1919) by Leoš Janáček; The viola d'amore represents the title character.
 Romeo and Juliet (1935–1936) by Sergei Prokofiev
 ...?risonanze!... (1996–1997) by Olga Neuwirth
 The Misprision of Transparency (2001) by Aaron Cassidy

Film
 Bernard Herrmann's score for On Dangerous Ground (1951) makes extensive use of the viola d'amore for the female protagonist's theme. The performer of the instrument Virginia Majewski receives a credit in the film's opening titles.

Note:    The papers of Walter Voigtlander contain 142 arrangements and transcriptions of works for the instrument.

Pedagogical works 
 The Modern Viole d'Amour Player, Systematically Arranged Material for the Studie of the Viole d'Amour for the Violin Player by Walter Voigtlander (written before 1914).  This is a basic pedagogical method, which starts the player from the most elementary elements of the instrument and progresses to a fair level of difficulty.  It contains adaptations of violin and viola exercises by many well-known pedagogues.  In addition, the work contains a supplement with many solo works and orchestral soli, by many composers, including his own 42 Studies (see below).  Available as part of The Walter Voigtlander Collection of Viola d'Amore Music, ca. 1890–1930 at the New York Public Library for the Performing Arts (see finding aid).
 42 Studies transcribed for the Viole d'Amour for the Violin Player, and Viola Studies for Self-Study by Walter Voigtlander.  It has annotations in both German and English.  It is the more advanced of his two pedagogical works, being intended, according to Rosenblum, largely for his own use.  Exercises from well-known violin and viola method books are extracted and modified for the viola d'amore.  Available as part of The Walter Voigtlander Collection of Viola d'Amore Music, ca. 1890–1930 at the New York Public Library for the Performing Arts (see finding aid).

Viola d'amore players 

 Attilio Ariosti (1666–1729)
 Louis-Toussaint Milandre (18th century)
 Antonio Vivaldi (1678-1741)
 Farinelli (1705–1782)
 Alexandro Marie Antoin Fridzeri (1741-1819)
 Chrétien Urhan (1790–1845)
 Johann Král (1823–1912)
 Louis van Waefelghem (1840–1908)
 George Saint-George (1841–1924)
 Hugo Walter Voigtlander (1859-1933)
 Kate Chaplin (1865–1948)
 Carl Valentin Wunderle (1866-1944)
 Henri Casadesus (1879–1947)
 Montagu Cleeve (1894–1993)
 Paul Hindemith (1895-1963)
 Karl Haas (1900–1970)
 Vadim Borisovsky (1900–1972)
 Tosca Kramer (1903–1976)
 Guido Santórsola (1904–1994)
 Walter Trampler (1915–1997)
 Gordon B. Childs (b. 1927)
 Mark Childs (b. 1944)
 Alice Harnoncourt (b. 1930)
 Marcus Thompson (b. 1946)
 Michael Kugel (b. 1947)
 Stephen Nachmanovitch (b. 1950)
 Alexander Labko
 Roy Goodman (b. 1951)
 Gunter Teuffel (b. 1955)
 Garth Knox (b. 1956)
 Richard Fleischman (b. 1963)
 Sviatoslav Belonogov (b. 1965)
 Rachel Barton Pine (b. 1974)
 Julia Rebekka Adler (b. 1978)
 James Wannan
 Hans Vermeersch (b. 1957)
 Tan Dun (b. 1957)
 Jasser Haj Youssef (b. 1980)
 Leonid Pateyuk (b.1990)
 Lucinda Moon
 Daniel Thomason (b. 1934)
 Myron Rosenblum (b. 1933)
 Hans Lauerer
 Rüdiger Müller-Nübling
 Harry Danks (1912–2001)
 Michel Pons
 Marianne Kubitschek-Rônez
 Margit Urbanetz-Vig
 Emil Seiler (1906–1998)
 Viera Bilikova
 Joseph Pietropaolo (1934–2014)
 Frank Bellino (1927-2013)
 Joseph Ceo
 Wolfram Just (b. 1936)
 Thomas Georgi
 Elly Winer
 Igor Boguslavsky
 Karl Stumpf (1907–1988)
 Aurelio Arcidiacono (1915–2001)
 Howard Boatwright (1912–1999)
 Virginia Majewski
 Lorenzo Nassimbeni
 Frantisek Slavik (1911–1999)
 Jacob Glick (1926-1999)
 Vazgen Muradian (1921–2018)
 Medardo Mascagni (1922–2001)
 Artur Paciorkiewicz
 John Calabrese (1941–2006)
 Jaroslav Horak (1914–2005)
 Katherine McGillivray (1970–2006)
 Guenter Ojstersek (b. 1930)
 Hans-Karl Piltz (b. 1923)
 Paul Shirley (1886–1984)
 Mary Elliott James (b. 1927)
 Jose Blankleder (d. 1998)
 Max Tonson-Ward (1918–2015)
 Elizabeth Watson
 Roland Kato
 Claire Kroyt
 Charles Martin Loeffler (1861–1935)
 Richard Stoelzer
 Arnt Martin (b. 1939)
 Leon King
 Karlina Ivane (b. 1979)
 Carlos Solare
 Haruko Tanabe
 Ines Wein
 Adriana Zoppo
 Ludwig Hampe
 Sibylle Hoedt-Schmidt
 Christoph Angerer
 Gheorghe & Simona Balan
 Christiane Guhl
 Simon Steinkühler
 Anne Schumann
 Adrian Susanin (b. 1956)
 Rachel Stott
 Helmut Tzschöckell (1933–1999)
 Maricel Méndez (b.1985)
 Maureen Murchie
Jürgen Lantz 
Leszek Kuśmirek

See also 
 Hardanger fiddle

References

External links 

 viola d'amore society of America
 Viola d'amore website
 List of works featuring the Viola d'amore at IMSLP
 Inventory of the Karl Stumpf Viola d'Amore Scores in the Music Division of The New York Public Library for the Performing Arts
 Orpheon Foundation, Vienna, Austria - Collection of historical instruments. Website includes pictures and details of some violas d'amore
 Viola d'amore info and performing editions
 New York Public Library for the Performing Arts, Walter Voigtlander Collection of Viola d'Amore music

String instruments with sympathetic strings
Viol family instruments